Danbury is a city in Connecticut, United States.

Danbury may also refer to:

Places
 Danbury, Saskatchewan, Canada
 Danbury, Essex, England, UK
 Danbury, Iowa, U.S.
 Danbury, Nebraska, U.S.
 Danbury, New Hampshire, U.S.
 Danbury, North Carolina, U.S.
 Danbury, Ohio, U.S.
 Danbury, Texas, U.S.
 Danbury, Wisconsin, U.S.

Other uses
 Danbury Municipal Airport, an airport in Danbury, Connecticut
 Danbury Branch, a branch of Metro-North Railroad's New Haven Line
 Danbury station, a Metro-North railroad station in Connecticut

See also
 Federal Correctional Institution, Danbury
 North Danbury station, a proposed Metro-North railroad station in Connecticut